Korobov (from короб meaning box) is a Russian masculine surname, its feminine counterpart is Korobova. It may refer to:

 Anton Korobov (born 1985), Ukrainian chess player
 Daria Korobova (born 1989), Russian synchronized swimmer
 Dmitry Korobov (born 1989), Belarusian ice hockey player
 Dmitri Korobov (footballer) (born 1994), Russian football player
 Felix Korobov  (born c.1975), Russian conductor
 Igor Korobov (1956–2018), Russian intelligence official
 Maxim Korobov (born 1957), Russian businessman 
 Matvey Korobov (born 1983), Russian boxer

Russian-language surnames